Detinets or Dytynets is an ancient Rus' city-fort or central fortified part of a city, similar to the meaning of kremlin (fortification), citadel. The term was used in the Kievan Rus', in Chernihiv, Novgorod the Great (see Novgorod Detinets), Kyiv and others.

Old Russian manuscripts mention detinets in various places of Kievan Rus since the end of the 11th century. From the 13th to the 14th century detinets was used only in the Russian Pskov-Novgorod region.

The origin of the term is uncertain. Some derive it from the  Old East Slavic word deti – "children", suggesting it was used to hide children and other less able people during the siege. Polish philologist Lucyjan Malinowski derives the similarly-sounding Polish term  – "courtyard", from detinets.

References

Kremlins